Remus Ludu (13 May 1914 – 1982) was a Romanian gymnast. He competed in eight events at the 1936 Summer Olympics.

References

1914 births
1982 deaths
Romanian male artistic gymnasts
Olympic gymnasts of Romania
Gymnasts at the 1936 Summer Olympics
People from Târgu Lăpuș